Robert Richard Hall (10 December 1865 – 8 April 1938) was a Canadian politician.

Born in Fenelon Township, Victoria County, Canada West, Hall was educated at the Cambray Public School and the Peterborough Collegiate and Vocational School Institute. A lawyer, Hall was elected to the House of Commons of Canada for the electoral district of Peterborough West at the 1904 general elections. A Liberal, he did not run in 1908. He was defeated in the 1917 election.

References
 
 The Canadian Parliament; biographical sketches and photo-engravures of the senators and members of the House of Commons of Canada. Being the tenth Parliament, elected 3 November 1904

1865 births
1938 deaths
Liberal Party of Canada MPs
Members of the House of Commons of Canada from Ontario